Anisacanthus brasiliensis is a plant native to the Caatinga vegetation of Brazil.

External links
 Anisacanthus brasiliensis
 Anisacanthus brasiliensis
   List of taxa in the Embrapa Recursos Genéticos e Biotecnologia: Anisacanthus brasiliensis

Acanthaceae
Endemic flora of Brazil